Carcinopyga lichenigera is a moth of the family Erebidae. It was described by Cajetan and Rudolf Felder in 1874. It is found in eastern Afghanistan, northern Pakistan, Kashmir and Ladakh.

Subspecies
Carcinopyga lichenigera lichenigera
Carcinopyga lichenigera nuytenae de Freina, 1982 (Pakistan)

References

Callimorphina
Moths described in 1874